The Doddaballapur City Municipal Council (DCMC) is the administrative body responsible for the civic and infrastructural assets of the Doddaballapura City area of India.

Doddaballapur City Municipal Council is run by a city council. The city council is composed of elected representatives, called "Councillors", including one from each of the wards (localities) of the city. Elections are held once every five years. First elections to the newly created body were held in 2013.

History 
The town of Doddaballapura had been in existence prior to the 12th century and was named on behalf of a messenger traveling during the 10th century called "Dodda-Balla." It is older than the Bengaluru (Bangalore) city which has now overgrown engulfing many of its neighboring villages and towns. The history of municipal governance of Doddaballapura dates back to July 30, 1917, when nine leading citizens of the city formed a Municipal Board under the Improvement of Towns Act. The following year, the concept of elected representatives came into being and also saw the introduction of property tax.

Fresh elections were held in June 2013.

Wards 
DCMC is divided into eight City municipal ward, for the ease of administration:

 Someshwara Badavane
 Gangadharapura
 Muttasandra
 Vinayaka Nagara
 Sidhenayakana Halli
 Muttur
 Dargapura
 Venkataramana Swamy devalaya
 Sanjay Nagara
 Veerabhadrana Palya
 Karenahalli
 Kanakadasa Road
 Nekara Kaloni
 Tubagare Pete
 Chawdeshwari Gudi Beedi
 Kalasi Palya
 Kote Road
 Kuchappana Pete
 Maruti Vyayama Shale
 Pinjaru Bidu
 Hemavati Pete
 Nagartara Pete
 Chikka Pete
 Vaishara Beedi
 Yele Pete
 Kumbara Pete
 Maruti Nagara
 Ganigara Pete
 Vaddara Pete
 Mutyalamma Devastana Road
 Shanthi Nagara

See also 
 Doddaballapura
 Karnataka

References

External links 
Doddaballapur City Municipal Council

Doddaballapura Taluk
Municipal councils in Karnataka
Bangalore Rural district